Kat Lehmer (also known as Kathi Lehmer) is an American film director, writer, actor and artist, best known for her cult film Mama and Damian.

Life and career
While attending the Pennsylvania Academy of the Fine Arts in Philadelphia where she studied painting, drawing, and sculpture, Lehmer was inspired by the works of an earlier alumnus, David Lynch, to pursue her interest in film making. A subsequent move to New York's Lower East Side exposed her to the underground film movement prevalent in the city during the 1980s where she lived across the street from ABC No Rio, a noted art and punk enclave where underground films were shown.

Lehmer started her film production company, Trinka Five Films in 2004. She wrote her first feature-length script for Mama and Damian in 2004, then produced, directed, and starred in the low-budget film production in 2007. Mama and Damian is social commentary cloaked in a tale about a half-bear, half-human boy who begins to push the boundaries of his insular world. Lehmer plays the hybrid bear-boy's dominatrix mother. The film continues to gain a cult film following through DVD and video streaming.

According to IMDb, Lehmer redesigned her own apartment to work as the main set for Mama and Damian. In an interview she said, "we couldn't move anything in my apartment for a year."

Lehmer's self-proclaimed quest to study all the arts that comprise the making of a film came in many forms.  She studied costuming, fashion design, and photography in Philadelphia and New York. She belonged to several rock bands for which she wrote and performed. She worked as a display artist for FAO Schwarz and Bergdorf Goodman. She has also acted in a number of independent films. Lehmer studied editing at Immagine Studios in Wilmington Delaware and edits her own films.

Lehmer is currently in production in Philadelphia on her film Mortal, an existential vampire saga.
She is also directing a documentary about Sunshine Arts, a unique neighborhood arts center located in an underprivileged area outside of Philadelphia.

Filmography

Director

 Sunshine Arts (2011)	
 Mortal (2010)	
 Mama and Damian (2007)

Producer
 Internet Fear (2005)

References

External links
 official website Trinka Five Films	
 
 Review of Mama and Damian at Spout.com	
 
 official web site Sunshine Arts
 Kat Lehmer films Dalai Lama visit

See also
List of female directors

Living people
Year of birth missing (living people)
American film directors
American women film directors
21st-century American women